Tselinnoye is a rural locality (a selo) and the administrative center of Tselinny District, Kurgan Oblast, Russia. Population:

References

Notes

Sources

Rural localities in Kurgan Oblast